Asus Memo Pad™ 8 is a middle-range Android tablet computer manufactured by Taiwanese corporation Asus. The tablet was announced in September 2013 and is expected to go on sale before the end of the 2013 holiday season. The device runs on Android 4.2 (Jelly Bean). 

A second generation model was announced on June 2, 2014 with the model name Asus MeMO Pad 8 ME581CL which now had a 64-bit 2.3GHz Intel Atom Z3580 processor, and full HD screen with 1920×1200 pixels resolution.

1st gen. Specifications
 8-inch IPS LCD display
 1.6 GHz quad-core processor
 1 GB of RAM
 5 MP rear camera

Reception
Computeractive rated the tablet 4 out of 5 stars, calling it "A good mini tablet, but for most the Nexus 7 is a far better buy."

References

External links
Official website

Tablet computers
Android (operating system) devices
Asus products
Portable media players